Ajuricaba (???? —  1728) was a leader of the Manaos indigenous nation in the early 18th century. He rebelled against the colonizers, refusing to serve as a slave where he became a symbol of resistance and freedom. Born in Amazonian lands, spent many years away from the tribe, but was forced to return to the conviviality of the others after the murder of his father by the hands of the invaders. The native vowed revenge and sought out the Dutch — who were also enemies of Portugal — to put his plan into practice. The Manaos had allied themselves with the Dutch in Guyana. Ajuricaba, in an act considered an ostensible challenge to Portuguese sovereignty in the region, even carried a Dutch flag in his canoe. The Portuguese in the Amazon feared that other indigenous peoples as well as black slaves in the region would follow the example of the Manaos, thus paving the way for a Dutch invasion of the Amazon River valley, or opening a riot for a possible general revolt against the Lusitanian crown, forcing them into a direct conflict, a war they called of "guerra justa" (just war).

Biography
Ajuricaba's origins are unclear, it is believed that he was born in the Rio Negro valley, in the region of Aldeia de Mariuá (today Barcelos, Brazil), possibly educated by Jesuit priests, many historians say that his war tactics were intelligent and that he was a good negotiator, to the point of forming a conglomerate of indigenous nations and forming trades with other Europeans in his neighborhood. It is not clear, the reasons for him to enter into direct conflict with the colonists, but possibly it was due to the death of his loved ones, mainly his father. Ajuricaba became known for being one of the indigenous leaders who fought against the slavery of his people and to deny to submit to slave labor, even winning the admiration of his enemies. Lusitanian chroniclers revealed that after his capture, possibly made by the betrayal of some of his allies, and taken to be jugged by the Portuguese court, he commanded a riot and committed suicide by throwing himself into the river.

Background
At the end of the 17th century and beginning of the 18th century, a smallpox epidemic hit hard the amerindian populations on the Brazilian coast, leaving the scarce natives for slave labor and forcing European settlers to enter the jungle to seek and capture more natives for slave labor, in missions called "descimentos", in the Amazon River valley, these missions could sometimes be obtained by armed incursions against tribes considered hostile to the settlers. With more frequent incursions, by so-called "rescue troops": expeditions aimed at rescuing royal natives, or presumably enslaved by others. Reports of the time reveal that the contact of these groups with Europeans compromised not only their cultural identity, but also their physical integrity, since they were affected by diseases for which they had no defenses or immunities. During the 1723 campaign, the colonizers encountered the Manaos people, between the valley of the Negro and Amazon rivers, and considered their presence hostile. The then governor of the province of Grão-Pará, João da Maia da Gama, sent the chronicler Belchior Mendes de Moraes to investigate these people. Mendes informed the governor of the province that the hostile natives practiced acts of cannibalism and maintained incestuous relations, besides being allies of the Dutch, a nation that was Portugal's enemy at the time; it is believed that Belchior Mendes wanted to call the attention of the church and the king of Portugal, D. João V, because saw a risk of insubordination ignored by the king and also by the religious institution, a former Lusitanian chronicler, reported that the natives were well armed and fought with tactics known today as guerrilla warfare, where firearms and cannons were seen. Mendes identified the leader of Manaos people and called him Ajuricaba, which means gathering of bees.

Honors
The city of Manaus, in the Brazilian Amazon, received this name in honor of the Manaos natives, the tribe to which Ajuricaba belonged, its name is honored to a city in the interior of the State of Rio Grande do Sul of Ajuricaba, several places in Brazil, especially in Amazon region, are called of Ajuricaba.

See also
 Slavery among the indigenous peoples of the Americas
 Atlantic slave trade to Brazil
 Manaus

References

Social history of Brazil
History of Amazonia
Amazon basin